Penistone Church Football Club is an English football club based in Penistone, Barnsley, South Yorkshire. They play in the Northern Counties East League Premier Division, at level 9 of the English football league system.

History
Formed in 1906 after the merger of Penistone Choirboys and Penistone Juniors, Penistone Church initially played in the Sheffield Amateur League and Penistone League. In 1909 they were the first winners of the Sheffield & Hallamshire Junior Cup, winning the cup again in 1937.

In 1948 they were the first ever opponents of Sheffield Wednesday's youth team, in a Hatchard League fixture. When the Hatchard League merged with the Sheffield Association League, Penistone were founder members of the new Sheffield & Hallamshire County Senior League. They first reached the Premier Division in 1995 and were something of a yo-yo club during the 1990s, flitting between the Premier Division and Division One on numerous occasions.

They finished as Premier Division runners-up in 2003 but would later spend yet another year in Division One after relegation in 2007. They finally established themselves as one of the top sides in the league during the early 2010s, and in 2014 they were promoted to the Northern Counties East League Division One, having made their FA Vase debut in 2013.

In 2016 they qualified for the inaugural Division One play-offs, but missed out on promotion to the Premier Division after losing their semi-final against AFC Emley, but a year later they beat the same opponents in a semi-final re-match before going on to beat Grimsby Borough in the final to win promotion to the Premier Division.

Season-by-season record

Notable former players
Players that have played in the Football League either before or after playing for Penistone Church –

  Harry Fearnley
  Seth King
  John Stones

Ground
The club plays at the Memorial Ground, Church View Road, Penistone, S36 6AT.

Honours

League
Sheffield & Hallamshire County Senior League Premier Division
Promoted: 2013–14
Sheffield & Hallamshire County Senior League Division One
Promoted: 1993–94 (champions), 1996–97, 2000–01 (champions), 2007–08
Sheffield & Hallamshire County Senior League Division Two
Promoted: 1991–92
Hatchard League
Champions: 1950–51, 1960–61

Cup
Sheffield & Hallamshire Junior Cup
Winners: 1908–09, 1936–37
Sheffield & Hallamshire County Senior League Cup
Winners: 2011–12, 2013–14
Northern Counties East Football League Cup
Winners: 2016–17

Records
Best League performance: 2nd in Northern Counties East League Premier Division, 2018–19
Best FA Amateur Cup performance: 2nd Qualifying Round, 1951–52, 1960–61
Best FA Vase performance: 1st Round, 2016-17 
Record attendance: 825 v Emley A.F.C., Northern Counties East League Premier Division, 2nd January 2022

References

External links

Football clubs in England
Football clubs in South Yorkshire
Association football clubs established in 1906
1906 establishments in England
Sheffield & Hallamshire County FA members
Penistone
Sport in Barnsley
Hatchard League
Sheffield Association League
Sheffield & Hallamshire County Senior Football League
Northern Counties East Football League
Sheffield Amateur League